is a Japanese voice actor who works for 81 Produce. 2022

Notable voice roles
Avenger (TV)
Bakuman. (TV 3) as Mamoru Tamiya; Manager (ep 23)
Battle Spirits: Shōnen Toppa Bashin (TV) as Man (ep 12)
Cardfight!! Vanguard (TV) as Yūta Izaki
Cardfight!! Vanguard: Asia Circuit Hen (TV) as Yūta Izaki
Cardfight!! Vanguard: Legion Mate-Hen (TV) as Yūta Izaki
Cardfight!! Vanguard: Link Joker Hen (TV) as Yūta Izaki
D.Gray-man (TV) as Cheetah (ep 32)
Dual! Parallel Trouble Adventure (TV) as Kazuki Yotsuga
Dual! Parallel Trouble Adventures Special as Kazuki Yotsuga
Early Reins (OAV) as Assistant Engineer; Henchman
G-Saviour (live-action TV movie) as Computer
Gekito! Crush Gear Turbo (TV) as Shinomiya Rai
Glass Mask (TV 2/2005) as Hiroshi Yoshizawa (ep 30)
Golgo 13 (TV) as Marty's man (ep 4)
.hack//Legend of the Twilight (TV) as Tom
Hanaukyo Maid-tai (TV) as exercise dept. A (ep 6); host B (ep 4); male student B (ep 2); man C (ep 5)
Hanaukyo Maid-tai OAV as bear (ep 2); student (ep 1); subordinate (ep 3)
Hand Maid May (TV) as Kazuya Saotome
Hikaru no Go (TV) as Chinese Pro (ep 67); Ryo Iijima
His and Her Circumstances (TV) as Leader of Kento team; Male Student (ep 2); Yoshida (ep 5)
Initial D: Fourth Stage (TV) as Todo Student (ep 3)
Kaikan Phrase (TV) as Lucy May member (eps 2, 37); Shin-chan (ep 40)
Kure-nai (OAV) as Criminal 1 (OVA 1)
Kurenai (TV) as Man 2 (ep 1); Student C (ep 3)
Maburaho (TV) as Male Student; Takashi Yamaguchi
Magical Warfare (TV) as Makoto Hitouji
(The) Marshmallow Times (TV) as Clove
Massugu ni Ikō (TV) as Student (ep 1)
Nagasarete Airantou (TV) as Teruteru Machou (Machi's shikigami; eps 12, 20, 24)
Ojamajo Doremi Na-i-sho (OAV) as Manabu Takagi
Panyo Panyo Di Gi Charat (TV) as Conceited Man
Parappa the Rapper (TV) as Hockey Player (ep 26); Voice on the Phone (ep 20)
Petite Princess Yucie (TV) as Arc
Pokémon (TV) as Boat driver (ep 192); Toy shop employee (ep 138)
Pokémon Chronicles (TV) as Jubei (ep 12)
Restol, The Special Rescue Squad (Korean TV) as Kang Maru
Samurai Deeper Kyo (TV) as Shindara
Starship Operators (TV) as Taishi Kase
Steel Angel Kurumi (TV) as Townsperson (ep 9)
Strawberry Eggs (TV) as Kyousuke Aoki
Tokyo Underground (TV) as Raichi
Zoids: Fuzors (TV) as Malloy
Tom in .hack//Legend Of The Twilight
Kazuki Yotsuga in Dual! Parallel Trouble Adventure
Leonhart (Leon) in Final Fantasy II (PlayStation version)
Brother, Clasko, Keepa, and Wantz in Final Fantasy X
Brother and Clasko in Final Fantasy X-2
Potato-kun in Hamtaro
Kazuya Saotome in Hand Maid May
Takashi Yamaguchi in Maburaho
Arc in Petite Princess Yucie
Kang Maru in RESTOL, The Special Rescue Squad
Kyousuke Aoki in Strawberry Eggs
Clove in The Marshmallow Times
Shindara in Samurai Deeper Kyo

Dubbing
CatDog as Lube Catfield McDog

External links

Year of birth missing (living people)
Living people
Male voice actors from Chiba Prefecture
Japanese male video game actors
Japanese male voice actors
81 Produce voice actors
20th-century Japanese male actors
21st-century Japanese male actors